The following is a list of populated places in Kosovo, arranged by municipality.

Deçan (Dečani)

Gjakovë (Ðakovica)

Drenas (Glogovac)

Gjilan (Gnjilane)

Dragash (Dragaš)

Istog (Istok)

Kaçanik (Kačanik)

Klinë (Klina)

Fushë Kosovë (Kosovo Polje)

Kamenicë (Kosovska Kamenica)

Mitrovicë (Kosovska Mitrovica)

Leposaviq (Leposavić)

Lipjan (Lipljan)

Malishevë (Mališevo)

Novobërdë (Novo Brdo)

Obiliq (Obilić)

Rahovec (Orahovac)

Pejë (Peć)

Podujevë (Podujevo)

Prishtinë (Priština)

Prizren

Skënderaj (Srbica)

Shtime (Štimlje)

Shtërpcë (Štrpce)

Suharekë (Suva Reka)

Ferizaj (Uroševac)

Viti (Vitina)

Vushtrri (Vučitrn)

Zubin Potok

Zveçan (Zvečan)

See also 
 Administrative divisions of Kosovo
 Districts of Kosovo
 Municipalities of Kosovo
 Cities and towns in Kosovo

References

!
Kosovo